Bravebird is the second studio album by American R&B-soul singer-songwriter Amel Larrieux, released in the United States on January 20, 2004 by her independent label Blisslife Records. The album features the single "For Real", which reached number forty-five on Billboards Hot R&B/Hip-Hop Songs chart, becoming Larrieux's second highest-charting solo single on the chart after 1999's "Get Up".

Album information 
On the significance of the album title and song "Bravebird", Larrieux told Barnes & Noble:

"I read a story in a magazine [about a survivor of female genital mutilation] and wrote about it. I guess it was a gift to her to extol her bravery. [The album title] became appropriate also because true supporters of my music found ways to hear the song before it got on the album. It had been floating around to DJs two years ago. And I do shows and perform the song, so everybody knew it. So I started referring to [my fans] as brave birds when I write messages to them on my web site." It is likely she was referring to Waris Dirie who is the author of Desert Flower.

Track listing 
All songs written by Amel Larrieux and Laru Larrieux.

 "For Real" – 3:46
 "Bravebird" – 4:48
 "Dear to Me" – 4:12
 "All I Got" – 3:50
 "Beyond" – 3:05
 "We Can Be New" – 4:57
 "Giving Something Up" – 3:42
 "Your Eyes" – 3:30
 "Congo" – 4:40
 "Sacred" – 3:43
 "Say You Want It All" – 4:04
 "All I Got2" – 2:48

Japanese edition 
 "For Real" – 3:46
 "Bravebird" – 4:48
 "Dear to Me" – 4:12
 "All I Got" – 3:50
 "Beyond" – 3:05
 "We Can Be New" – 4:57
 "Giving Something Up" – 3:42
 "Your Eyes" – 3:30
 "Congo" – 4:40
 "Sacred" – 3:43
 "All I Got2" – 2:48
 "Just Once" - 3:42
 "Say You Want It All" – 4:04

Personnel

Musicians 
 Amel Larrieux – vocals

Production 

 Amel Larrieux – producer, art direction
 Laru Larrieux – producer, engineer, art direction, mixing
 Kwame "Young MIchael K Success" Harris – engineer, mixing
 Eric "Ebo" Butler – engineer, mixing
 Basho Ink – producer

 Herb Powers – mastering
 Andy Schlesinger – engineer, mixing
 Threadhead – producer

Charts

Release history

References 

2004 albums
Amel Larrieux albums
Folk albums by American artists